The United Kingdom held a national preselection to choose the song that would go to the Eurovision Song Contest 1978. It was held on Friday 31 March 1978 at the Royal Albert Hall and presented by Terry Wogan. The songs were backed by the Alyn Ainsworth Orchestra.

The Eurovision Song Contest was broadcast on 22 April 1978, with Terry Wogan providing the BBC Television commentary and Ray Moore providing the BBC Radio 2 commentary. Colin Berry returned to present the UK jury results.

Before Eurovision

A Song for Europe 1978 
Fourteen regional juries voted on the songs: Bristol, Bangor, Leeds, Norwich, Newcastle, Aberdeen, Birmingham, Manchester, Belfast, Cardiff, Plymouth, Glasgow, Southampton and London. Each jury voted internally and ranked the songs 1–12, awarding 12 points for their highest scoring song, down to 1 point for the lowest scoring entry.

Final 
"The Bad Old Days" won the national and came 11th in the contest. Broadcast on Good Friday, a national holiday in the UK, A Song for Europe was watched by 13.7 million viewers and was the 16th-most watched programme of the week - the show's highest ever rating.

Both groups 'Co-Co' and 'Sunshine' had participated in the A Song for Europe 1976 contest, albeit with different line-ups. 'Co-Co' would return to the A Song for Europe contest in 1980 with another line-up, under the name 'The Main Event'. Cheryl Baker of 'Co-Co' would eventually win the Eurovision Song Contest 1981 with the group 'Bucks Fizz'.

UK Discography 
Christian - Shine It On: Polydor 2059012.
Brown Sugar - Oh No, Look What You've Done: State STAT77.
Fruit Eating Bears - Door in My Face: DJM DJS10857.
Jacquie Sullivan - Moments: Air CHS2219.
Sunshine - Too Much In Love: State STAT76.
Ronnie France - Lonely Nights: Pye 7N46062.
The Jarvis Brothers - One Glance: EMI EMI2777.
Co-Co - The Bad Old Days: Ariola/Hansa AHA513. 
Bob James - We Got It Bad: Polydor 2059016.
Midnight - Don't Bother to Knock: Ariola/Hansa AHA514.
Babe Rainbow - Don't Let Me Stand in Your Way: Mercury 6007113.
Labi Siffre - Solid Love: EMI EMI2750.
Only the winning song reached the UK singles chart.

At Eurovision

Voting

References

1978
Countries in the Eurovision Song Contest 1978
Eurovision
Eurovision